Agropyron mosaic virus is a plant pathogenic virus of the family Potyviridae.

External links
 ICTVdB - The Universal Virus Database: Agropyron mosaic virus
 Family Groups - The Baltimore Method

Viral plant pathogens and diseases
Potyviridae